Silk Stocking District may refer to: 

Silk Stocking District (Talladega), in Talladega, Alabama, a historic district listed on the National Register of Historic Places (NRHP)
 The Silk Stocking National Historic District, one of six historic districts in Galveston, Texas
Lewistown Silk Stocking District, Lewistown, Montana, NRHP-listed
Upper East Side, New York City, also known as the Silk Stocking District